Valentin Yoskov (born 5 June 1998) is a Bulgarian professional footballer who plays as a forward for Septemvri Sofia on loan from CSKA 1948 Sofia II.

Career
Born in Burgas, Yoskov joined Cherno More's youth team at the age of 13, having arrived from Chernomorets Burgas. In the 2014–15 season, he scored 28 goals for the U-17 squad. 

Yoskov made his senior debut for the club in a 1–0 league loss against Levski Sofia on 23 October 2015, playing the final seven minutes in place of Todor Palankov. Four days later, he scored his first goal in a 5–0 away win over Vihar Stroevo for the Bulgarian Cup.

On 17 June 2017, Yoskov was loaned to Second League club Nesebar. On 22 July, he made his debut for the club in a 2–3 away defeat by Tsarsko Selo, coming on as substitute for Stamen Angelov. He scored the last goal in the game.  Yoskov returned to his parent club for pre-season training in preparations for the 2018–19 season.

Statistics

References

External links

1998 births
Living people
Sportspeople from Burgas
Bulgarian footballers
Bulgaria youth international footballers
Association football forwards
PFC Cherno More Varna players
PFC Nesebar players
FC Chernomorets Balchik players
FC CSKA 1948 Sofia players
SFC Etar Veliko Tarnovo players
First Professional Football League (Bulgaria) players
Second Professional Football League (Bulgaria) players